Emelianthe is a monotypic genus of flowering plants belonging to the family Loranthaceae. The only species is Emelianthe panganensis.

Its native range is Northeastern and Eastern Tropical Africa.

References

Loranthaceae
Loranthaceae genera
Monotypic Santalales genera